The Hotel Venice is a historic hotel in Venice, Florida. It is located at 200 North Nassau Street. On February 6, 1984, it was added to the U.S. National Register of Historic Places.

References

External links
 Sarasota County listings at National Register of Historic Places
 Sarasota County listings at Florida's Office of Cultural and Historical Programs

National Register of Historic Places in Sarasota County, Florida
Hotel buildings on the National Register of Historic Places in Florida